Joseph Berchtold (6 March 1897 – 23 August 1962) was an early senior Nazi Party member and a co-founder of both the  (SA) and  (SS).

Berchtold served in World War I and upon Germany's defeat joined the German Workers' Party (DAP), a small extremist organization at the time.

After resigning as the SS leader, Berchtold spent much of his time writing for Nazi magazines and journals. He survived the war, but was arrested by the Allies. Berchtold was later released and died in 1962.

Early life
Born on 6 March 1897 in Ingolstadt, Berchtold attended school in Munich from 1903 to 1915. He went on to serve in the Royal Bavarian Army during World War I (1914-18) and held the rank of second lieutenant at the end of the war. After the war, he studied economics at the University of Munich and gained employment as a journalist. In early 1920, he joined the small right-wing extremist group the German Workers' Party (DAP). He remained in the party after it became known as the National Socialist German Workers' Party (Nazi Party; NSDAP). Berchtold became the treasurer of the Nazi Party, until he resigned at the end of July, 1921.

SA career

Upon re-joining the party in 1922, Berchtold became a member of the Sturmabteilung ("Storm Detachment"; SA), a paramilitary wing formed to protect its speakers at rallies, and to police Nazi meetings. Adolf Hitler, leader of the party since 1921, ordered the formation of a small separate bodyguard dedicated to his protection only instead of a suspected mass of the party in 1923. Originally the unit was composed of only eight men, commanded by Julius Schreck and Berchtold. It was initially designated the Stabswache ("Staff Guard"). Later that year, the unit was renamed Stoßtrupp-Hitler ("Shock Troop-Hitler").

On 9 November 1923 the Stoßtrupp, along with the SA and several other paramilitary units, took part in what would become known as the Beer Hall Putsch. The plan was to take control of Munich and then seize total power in Berlin. The coup d'état failed and resulted in the death of 16 Nazi supporters and 4 police officers. In the aftermath of the putsch both Hitler and other Nazi leaders were incarcerated at Landsberg Prison. The Nazi Party and all associated formations, including the Stoßtrupp, were officially disbanded. Berchtold then left Germany and fled to Tirol, Austria. Berchtold was tried in absentia before the special People's Court in Munich in 1924 for his role in the Beer Hall Putsch and sentenced to a prison term. During his time in Austria, Berchtold continued to be involved with Nazi Party activities, even though it was illegal.

When Hitler was released from prison on 20 December 1924, Berchtold was District Director of the Nazi Party in Carinthia, Austria and was leader of the SA there. After the re-formation of the Nazi Party on 20 February 1925, he again joined the party, documented as member #964. In March 1926, Berchtold returned to Munich from Austria. He became chief of the SA in Munich.

SS career
On 15 April 1926, Berchtold became the successor to Schreck as chief of the Schutzstaffel ("Protection Squadron"; SS), a special elite branch of the party under the control of the SA. Berchtold changed the title of the office position which became known as the Reichsführer-SS. He issued new rules to establish the position of the SS. The rules stated the unit was "...neither a military organisation nor a group of hangers-on, but a small squad of men that our movement and our Führer can rely on." He further stressed that the men must follow "only party discipline". He was considered to be more dynamic than his predecessor, but was still unable to keep the party organizers at bay. He was frustrated in his efforts to have a more independent unit and became disillusioned by the SA's authority over the SS. On 1 March 1927, he handed over leadership of the SS to his deputy Erhard Heiden.

After the SS
In 1927, he became a lead writer for Völkischer Beobachter, the Nazi Party newspaper. From 1928 to 1945, Berchtold was an SA leader on the staff of the Supreme SA leadership (OSAF). In 1934, he became the permanent deputy editor-in-chief of the Völkischer Beobachter newspaper. In the following years, he operated primarily as a journalist and propagandist. In 1928, Berchtold founded the newspaper SA-Mann ("SA Man"). Until January 1938, he was the main writer of the paper, which was published by the OSAF. Berchtold was also the author of various Nazi publications and staff of additional magazines.

Additional posts in Nazi Germany were of secondary importance to Berchtold. From March 1934 to the end of the war, Berchtold was city councilman of the town council in Munich. On 15 November 1935, Berchtold was appointed to the Reich Culture Senator. In addition, he belonged to the "Cultural Circle of the SA" since 6 March 1936, and to the Reichstag from 29 March 1936, onward. From 29 April 1940, Berchtold served as a captain of the reserve on a temporary basis in the Wehrmacht.

Post-war
After World War II in Europe ended, Berchtold was arrested in 1945 and interned at Oberpfaffenhofen. He died on 23 August 1962, in Herrsching am Ammersee, near Munich.

Promotions

Awards and decorations 
1914 Iron Cross 2nd Class 
Military Merit Cross (Bavaria) with Swords 
The Honour Cross of the World War 1914/1918 with Swords, 1934
Blood Order #9, 1934
Honour Chevron for the Old Guard, 1934
Golden Party Badge, 1933
Nazi Party Long Service Award (bronze, silver, gold)

References

Citations

Bibliography
 
 
 
 
 
 
 

1897 births
1962 deaths
German Army personnel of World War I
Nazi Party officials
Nazis who participated in the Beer Hall Putsch
People from Ingolstadt
Reichsführer-SS
Sturmabteilung officers
Members of the Reichstag of Nazi Germany
People from the Kingdom of Bavaria
Military personnel from Ingolstadt
Recipients of the Iron Cross (1914), 2nd class